Philip Albrecht (born 21 November 1979) is a German former professional footballer who played as a forward.

Career
Albrecht began his career with Wedeler TSV before joining the youth team of Hamburger SV. He then signed a contract with VfL Pinneberg. In 2000, he was scouted by FC St. Pauli and spent one season with them in the Bundesliga. He retired in 2006.

References

External links
 

1979 births
Living people
German footballers
Association football forwards
FC St. Pauli players
Hamburger SV II players
Bundesliga players
2. Bundesliga players
21st-century German people